Apoplania is a genus of moths in the family Neopseustidae.

Species
Apoplania chilensis D.R. Davis, 1975
Apoplania penai Davis & Nielsen, 1980
Apoplania valdiviana Davis & Nielsen, 1985

External links
Systematics and Zoogeography of the Family Neopseustidae with the Proposal of a New Superfamily (Lepidoptera: Neopseustoidea)

Neopseustidae
Moth genera
Glossata genera